was a village located in Tsukubo District, Okayama Prefecture, Japan.

As of 2003, the village had an estimated population of 4,064 and a density of 396.88 persons per km2. The total area was 10.24 km2.

On March 22, 2005, Yamate, along with the village of Kiyone (also from Tsukubo District), was merged into the expanded city of Sōja.

Dissolved municipalities of Okayama Prefecture